Robert George Siebecker (October 17, 1854February 12, 1922) was an American attorney and the 11th Chief Justice of the Wisconsin Supreme Court.  He served on the Wisconsin Supreme Court for the last 19 years of his life (1903–1922).  Before being appointed to the Supreme Court, he served 13 years as a Wisconsin circuit court judge in central Wisconsin (Dane, Sauk, Columbia, and Marquette counties) and was a law partner of Robert M. "Fighting Bob" La Follette.

Early life and education
Siebecker was born in the town of Sumpter, in Sauk County, Wisconsin, the son of recent German American immigrants.  He moved to Madison, Wisconsin, to attend a private academy in 1872.  In 1874 he entered the University of Wisconsin, graduating in 1878.  He then attended the University of Wisconsin Law School and graduated in 1880. While at the University, he met Josephine La Follette, whom he later marry.  Josephine was the sister of future Wisconsin Congressman, Governor, and U.S. Senator Robert M. "Fighting Bob" La Follette.

Siebecker was admitted to the bar in 1879 and entered into a law partnership with La Follette.  Within a few years, both men entered public office.  La Follette was elected to Congress in 1884, and Siebecker was elected City Attorney for Madison in 1886.

Wisconsin Circuit Court

Siebecker was appointed Judge of the 9th Circuit of Wisconsin Courts by Governor William D. Hoard in January 1890.  He ultimately served in that seat for 13 years, winning re-election without opposition in 1891 and 1897.  At the time, the 9th Circuit was composed of Columbia, Dane, Marquette, and Sauk counties, with court proceedings held in Portage, Madison, Montello, and Baraboo, respectively.

Wisconsin Supreme Court
On March 20, 1903, Wisconsin Supreme Court justice Charles V. Bardeen died.  He had been set to run unopposed for another term on the court in the April 7, 1903, election.  Because his death left no living candidates on the ballot, the Wisconsin Legislature took action to set a special nomination period for new candidates to file petitions to appear on the ballot.  Siebecker was one of three candidates who filed sufficient signatures in the short, week-long nominating period.

Judge Siebecker won the election to the Supreme Court for a term beginning January 1904, defeating  and William Ruger—who had attempted to withdraw his name from the race.  Since the seat was already vacant, Governor La Follette—Siebecker's brother-in-law and former law partner—appointed him to join the court early almost immediately after the election. He was the 20th justice to serve on the Wisconsin Supreme Court, but the first to have been born in Wisconsin.

With the death of Chief Justice John B. Winslow in 1920, Siebecker became the 11th Chief Justice of the Wisconsin Supreme Court. He remained in that office until his death in 1922.

Personal life and family
Siebecker married Josephine La Follette in 1879. They had four children together, although one child died young.

Siebecker died in his home in Madison, Wisconsin.  He was eulogized by fellow Justice E. Ray Stevens, who said of him, "There is romance in the career of this boy from the farm who closed his life as the chief justice of this great court."

In addition to his judicial career, Justice Siebecker was a member and curator of the State Historical Society of Wisconsin.

References

External links
 

La Follette family
People from Sumpter, Wisconsin
University of Wisconsin–Madison alumni
University of Wisconsin Law School alumni
Chief Justices of the Wisconsin Supreme Court
Wisconsin state court judges
1854 births
1922 deaths